Southern Power may refer to:

 The former name of Duke Power, now Duke Energy
 Southern Power District, a publicly owned electric utility in south-central Nebraska
 Southern Power: a wholesale generation subsidiary of Southern Company
 Slave Power, in the Antebellum United States
 The name Australian rules football club Sutherland AFC are known by